Claudia Drake (born Olga Gloria Fishbine, January 30, 1918 – October 19, 1997) was an American actress and singer.

At age 5, Drake and her sister Ella (age 8) formed the La Marr sisters, and the duo performed in vaudeville. When she was older, Busby Berkeley saw her singing in a casino and signed her to a contract with Warner Bros. Her roles in films included being leading lady in Hopalong Cassidy Westerns. She appears in both leading and supporting roles in a variety of B movies, mostly Westerns, from the 1940s and 1950s. One of her more memorable supporting roles is the character Sue Harvey in the 1945 film noir Detour. During the 1950s she also performed in several American television series.

Filmography

References

Bibliography
 Renzi, Thomas C. Screwball Comedy and Film Noir: Unexpected Connections. McFarland, 2012.

External links

1918 births
1997 deaths
American film actresses
Actresses from Los Angeles
20th-century American actresses
20th-century American singers
20th-century American women singers